Paparara is a village on Aratika atoll. It is 3 km SE of Aratika Airport and 15 km NE of Aratika-Perles Airport.

References

External links 
 Aratika Atoll FP (EVS Islands)

Atolls of the Tuamotus